In the Hebrew Bible, as well as non-Jewish ancient texts from the region, the Northwest Semitic term Rephaite or Repha'im (cf. the plural word in ;) refers either to a people of greater-than-average height and stature in Deuteronomy 2:10-11, or departed spirits in the Jewish afterlife, Sheol as written in the following scriptures: Isaiah 26:14; Psalms 88:11, and Proverbs 9:18, as well as Isaiah 14:9.

Etymology 
There are two main groups of etymological hypotheses explaining the origins of the biblical term, Repha'im. The first group proposes that this is a native Hebrew language term, which could be derived either from the root רפא or רפה. The first root, רפא, conveys the meaning of healing, as in of the souls and these souls living in the Jewish afterlife Sheol for which they're waiting for the final judgement dictated by the Jewish God, Elohim. The second root, רפה, means being weak, powerless as in those souls within Sheol are weak in the sense that they hold no physical power as in the living world, and their status is wiped. All things of the living that gives the living power is thus moot in the land of the dead, Sheol, and its inhabitants are thus again powerless and weak, having to be submissive to the Jewish God, Elohim. The second group of etymological hypotheses treat the word rephaim as a loanword from some other ancient Semitic language. Among the proposals is the Akkadian rabu, a prince, but this explanation enjoys rather limited popularity. Far more support has been gained by the hypothesis which derives the Hebrew  from the Ugaritic  which denotes the semi-deified deceased ancestors who are mentioned in such sources as the so-called Rephaim Text (KTU 1:20–22). Despite the clash between these hypotheses and although the modern translations clearly distinguish between Rephaites as one of the tribes (e.g. Book of Genesis 14:5; 15:18–21; Book of Deuteronomy 2:11–20) and rephaim as the inhabitants of the underworld (e.g. Book of Isaiah 14:9–11; 26:13–15), the same word is used in the original text.

Canaanite people group

In the Hebrew Bible, "Rephaites" or "Repha'im" can describe an ancient race of giants in Iron Age Israel, or the places where these individuals were thought to have lived. In the biblical narrative, the Israelites were instructed to exterminate the previous inhabitants of the "promised land", i.e. Canaan, which include various named peoples, including some unusually tall/large individuals. Several passages in the Book of Joshua, and also , suggest that Og, the King of Bashan, was one of the last survivors of the Rephaim, and that his bed was 9 cubits long in ordinary cubits. The area of Moab at Ar (the region east of the Jordan), before the time of Moses, was also considered the land of the Rephaites.  notes that the Ammonites called the Rephaites "Zamzummim". In , the Moabites referred to them as the "Emim".

Long dead ancestors
Repha'im have also been considered the residents of the Netherworld (Sheol in the Hebrew Bible) in more recent scholarship. Possible examples of this usage appear as "shades", "spirits", or "dead" in various translations of the Bible. The Heb. root רפא means “heal”, and thus the masculine plural nominalized form of this root may indicate that these “deceased ancestors” could be invoked for ritual purposes that would benefit the living.

Various ancient Northwest Semitic texts are also replete with references to terms evidently cognate with Rephaim as the dead or dead kings. Lewis (1989) undertakes a detailed study of several enigmatic funerary ritual texts from the ancient coastal city of Ugarit. Lewis concludes that the “Ugaritic Funerary Text” provides important evidence for understanding Ugarit's cult of the dead, wherein beings called rapi'uma, the long dead, and malakuma, recently dead kings, were invoked in a funeral liturgy, presented with food/drink offerings, and asked to provide blessings for the reign of the current king. The many references to repha'im in the Hebrew Bible in contexts involving Sheol and dead spirits strongly suggests that many ancient Israelites imagined the spirits of the dead as playing an active and important role in securing blessings, healing, or other benefits in the lives of the living. In 2021, a new theory regarding the identity of the Rephaim was published by J. Yogev, which suggests that the Rephaim were systematically eradicated from biblical texts as an agenda to eliminate their memory according to monotheistic belief systems in biblical times.

"The link between Titan and poltergeist may very well be adduced from the verb stem, raphah, which means to sink or relax" (Levin, 1997, p. 17)[iv]

See also 
 Emek Refaim
 Nephilim
 Rujm el-Hiri, also called "Gilgal Refaim"
 The Book of Giants
 Valley of Rephaim

References

Notes 

 
Book of Deuteronomy
Book of Genesis
Book of Isaiah
Book of Joshua
Books of Chronicles
Books of Samuel
Phoenician mythology